Bengrina is a surname. Notable people with the surname include:

 Abdelkader Bengrina (born 1962), Algerian politician
 Mohamed Bengrina (born 1996), Algerian footballer

See also
 Bengin Ahmad

Surnames of African origin